Kaspars Kambala (born December 13, 1978) is a Latvian semi-professional basketball player, currently for BK Jūrmala, and a former professional boxer.

High school
A 1997 graduate of Homestead High School in Mequon, Wisconsin and a native of Riga, Latvia. He averaged 21 points and 12 rebounds in his senior season (1996–97) and earned All-Wisconsin honors, all-state, MVP of the Northshore Conference and all-county. Homestead compiled a 16-9 overall record and finished second in conference. Kambala played in the Eddie Jones Classic All-Star game, which was held at the Pyramid in Long Beach, California, on April 15, 1997.

College
Kambala played college basketball at UNLV from 1997 to 2001. He led the team in scoring in 1999-2000 (18.5 average) and 2000-01 (16.9). He finished up in 2001 as the program's 10th all-time highest scorer and ranks fourth on the school's all-time rebounding list, leading the team in boards in three of his four seasons on campus.

Professional career
Kaspars Kambala actually played professional basketball as a teenager in Latvia before going to America where he attended high school in Wisconsin and played college basketball at UNLV. He continued his career in Europe, playing for such high-level clubs as Efes Pilsen, Real Madrid, UNICS Kazan, Fenerbahçe.

In December 2006 he was suspended for doping. His suspension in basketball ended on December 12, 2008. When his sanction from playing basketball ended, Kas, as he is often called by fans, stated that he was in great shape and that he was once again ready to play at the highest level of European basketball. For few games he joined ASK Riga, but soon after went to Russia to play for Enisey Krasnoyarsk, where he spent next year and a half. In September 2010 Kambala joined Bulgarian team Lukoil Academic. In the middle of the season Kambala returned to Turkey and joined Aliağa Petkim. In July 2011 he signed with Türk Telekom B.K. for one season.

On July 11, 2015, Kambala signed with Adanaspor.

On June 7, 2016, he signed with Yakın Doğu Üniversitesi Spor Kulübü for a one-year $48000 contract.

Latvian national men's basketball team
In 2001 was Kaspars Kambala's first appearance for the Latvian national basketball team when he participated in the European Championship. He also participated in two more Eurobasket tournaments (2003, 2009).

Trivia
During his suspension from basketball Kaspars decided to become a professional boxer.

Kambala shares the Euroleague's single-game scoring record for last decade - 41 points against FC Barcelona on October 30, 2002 - with three players, Bobby Brown, Carlton Myers and the late Alphonso Ford.

In April 2014, Kambala released his autobiography "Kambala..., āmen!" that became a bestseller in Latvia.

Honors and awards 
 1998: Western Athletic Conference Tournament Champions (UNLV)
 2000: Mountain West Conference Regular Season and Tournament (UNLV)

Professional boxing record

References

External links

Kaspars Kambala at euroleague.net
Kaspars Kambala at unlvrebels.cstv.com
Kaspars Kambala at fiba.com
Kaspars Kambala at tblstat.net

1978 births
Living people
Adanaspor Basketbol players
Aliağa Petkim basketball players
Anadolu Efes S.K. players
ASK Riga players
BC Enisey players
BC UNICS players
Centers (basketball)
Doping cases in basketball
Fenerbahçe men's basketball players
Latvian men's basketball players
Latvian expatriates in Spain
Latvian expatriate basketball people in the United States
Latvian sportspeople in doping cases
Liga ACB players
Mahram Tehran BC players
PBC Academic players
Power forwards (basketball)
Real Madrid Baloncesto players
Basketball players from Riga
Türk Telekom B.K. players
UNLV Runnin' Rebels basketball players
Latvian male boxers
Heavyweight boxers